GlobalLogic is an American digital services company providing software product design and development services. It is an independent subsidiary of Hitachi Ltd. GlobalLogic has corporate headquarters in San Jose, California.

Company overview

Early history
GlobalLogic got its start in 2000 as Induslogic, a provider of outsourced software and product development services. Induslogic maintained a service delivery center in Noida, India. Rajul Garg and Tarun Upadhyay had worked together to start Pine Labs in 1998. Peter Harrison was appointed CEO in 2001 and Vasudev Bhandarkar joined the board in 2004.

Under the direction of its CEO Peter Harrison, the company incubated Pine Labs in 2001 and then divided this subsidiary in 2006 before selling it to Sequoia Capital. In 2006, Induslogic merged with Bonus Technology to form GlobalLogic, a new global product development services company.

The same year, the company received Series B venture round funding of $12.5M from Sequoia Capital and New Enterprise Associates in 2006 and acquired Lambent Technologies, an offshore software R&D services firm based in Nagpur, India.

2008–2013
In 2008, GlobalLogic opened offices in London, naming Mike Daniels as chairman of the board and hiring Shashank Samant as president.
The same year, it acquired U.S.-based Validio Software and its Ukraine-based development center.
Also, in 2008, the company received $29.5M in Series C venture round funding from Sequoia Capital, New Atlantic Ventures, and New Enterprise Associates. In 2009, GlobalLogic partnered with LumenData, a product development and services firm focused on enterprise data management, to open a delivery center in Bangalore. GlobalLogic also acquired two software R&D services firms: InterObject and Cubika. InterObject, based in Ramat Gan, Israel, works with embedded software, mobile and streaming media products. Cubika, based in Buenos Aires, Argentina, builds software products for the media, entertainment, telecom and finance markets. In 2010, GlobalLogic received funding from Goldman Sachs.

In 2011, GlobalLogic opened an office in Santiago, Chile to expand its operations in South America. It then acquired Rofous Software, a content engineering firm headquartered in Hyderabad, India with specialization in content engineering. The same year, GlobalLogic acquired Method Incorporated, a brand experience agency with offices in San Francisco, New York City and London.

In 2012, CEO Peter Harrison became vice chairman and its president, Shashank Samant, was appointed CEO.

In 2013, Apax Partners ("Apax"), a global private equity firm, acquired GlobalLogic. Rohan Haldea, Walden Rhines and Peter Bonfield joined the company's board of directors, and Salim Nathoo was named chairman.

2014–2021
In 2014, GlobalLogic hired Zaheer Allam as chief delivery officer and opened new delivery centers in Nagpur, India and Kosice, Slovakia. In 2015, the company opened a delivery center in Kraków, Poland. In 2016, Peter Bonfield took over the role of board chairman. The same year, GlobalLogic acquired REC Global, a Poland-based software development provider specializing in embedded technologies.

In 2017, the Canadian Pension Plan Investment Board (CPPIB) acquired 48% of GlobalLogic from Apax.

In 2018, Apax Partners sold its remaining 48% stake private equity firm Partners Group,.

In 2019, GlobalLogic acquired U.S.-based Skookum, a digital strategy and design firm.

In 2020, GlobalLogic appointed Rajaram Radhakrishnan as chief revenue officer.
The same year, GlobalLogic partnered with SimCorp to change the cloud delivery model for the SimCorp Dimension platform.
GlobalLogic then acquired Meelogic Consulting AG, a Berlin-based healthcare and automotive-focused software engineering firm. Next it acquired the ECS Group, a UK-based digital transformation consultancy.

On March 31, 2021, Hitachi announced that it would buy GlobalLogic for $9.6 billion. The acquisition was completed on July 14, 2021.
Under the terms of merger, Globalogic will continue to operate as an independent subsidiary.

OpenStreetMap Foundation 2018 elections incident
During the 2018 board elections of the OpenStreetMap Foundation, more than 100 individuals registered from the same IP address within a few hours. The signups were flagged immediately as suspicious but were not rejected by the OSMF board, because they were received after the deadline and so were not eligible to vote. Those voting to keep the memberships stated that there was no assumption of ill intent.

The OpenStreetMap Membership Working Group released a public report indicating a large group of signups from GlobalLogic.

GlobalLogic then offered to withdraw the memberships, and the OSMF board accepted the offer as resolution in February 2019.

References

2021 mergers and acquisitions
Consulting firms established in 2000
American companies established in 2000
Information technology consulting firms of the United States
Outsourcing companies
Companies based in San Jose, California
CPP Investment Board companies
Hitachi
American subsidiaries of foreign companies